Robert Russell (c. 1858–18 May 1938) was an Irish mathematician and academic at Trinity College Dublin (TCD), who served as Erasmus Smith's Professor of Mathematics (1917-1921).

Robert Russell was born in Portadown, Armagh, and was educated at Santry School, Portarlington.  He attended TCD, became a Scholar in 1877, and won the Brooke Prize, Bishop Law's Prize, McCullagh Prize, and Madden Prize.  He was awarded BA in mathematics (1880), became a Fellow a few years later, and got his MA (1888). In 1887, he was elected a member of the London Mathematical Society.  He spent his whole career at TCD, at various times serving as Junior Bursar, Junior Dean, Registrar of Chambers, and from the early 1920s on, Senior Bursar.

He was Donegall Lecturer in Mathematics (1904-1907), Erasmus Smith's Professor of Mathematics (1917-1921), and became Senior Fellow in 1920.

Selected papers
 Geometry of Surfaces Derived from Cubics, 26 June 1899
 Ruler Constructions in Connexion with Cubic Curves, 24 April 1893
 On a Theorem in Higher Algebra, The Quarterly Journal of Pure and Applied Mathematics, Volume 21, 23 May 2016

References

19th-century Irish mathematicians
20th-century Irish mathematicians
Alumni of Trinity College Dublin
Academics of Trinity College Dublin
Donegall Lecturers of Mathematics at Trinity College Dublin
1858 births
1938 deaths
People from Portadown
People educated at Santry School